The 10th constituency of Val-d'Oise is a French legislative constituency in the Val-d'Oise département.
It is currently represented by Aurélien Taché, who was elected as a member of La République En Marche! (LREM), but left it and joined the new Ecology Democracy Solidarity group in 2020.

Description

The 10th constituency of Val-d'Oise is a new seat created as a result of the 2010 redistricting of French legislative constituencies, which awarded the department with one additional seat. The constituency was created by taking two cantons from the old 2nd constituency of Val-d'Oise.

Historic Representation

Election results

2022

 
 
 
 
 
 
 
 
 
|-
| colspan="8" bgcolor="#E9E9E9"|
|-

2017

2012

 
 
 
 
 
 
|-
| colspan="8" bgcolor="#E9E9E9"|
|-

Sources
Official results of French elections from 2002: "Résultats électoraux officiels en France" (in French).

10